I Stand Alone is a 1998 French psychological drama art film written and directed by Gaspar Noé as his directorial debut, and starring Philippe Nahon, Blandine Lenoir, Frankye Pain, and Martine Audrain. The film, focusing on several pivotal days in the life of a butcher facing abandonment, isolation, rejection and unemployment, was the director's first feature-length production, and is a sequel to his 1991 short film Carne.

Plot
The film opens by revealing the history of the Butcher (who's given no other name) presented in narration which plays over a montage of still photographs: Orphaned at a young age, he was sexually abused by a priest. As a teenager, unable to have the opportunity to study and learn the profession of his choice, he reluctantly embraces the career of a butcher specializing in horse meat, a job already frowned upon at the time in France.

After several years of hard work, he finally opens his own butcher shop while his girlfriend gives birth to a daughter. When the woman realizes the infant is not a boy, she leaves the young father alone with the child. Embracing it as fate, the Butcher decides to take care of his daughter alone. As the single father is consumed by loneliness, he starts to become overprotective and develops incestuous feelings for his child. One day, when he sees blood on her skirt, he thinks she's been raped and stabs the man he thinks is responsible only to find out it was only menstrual blood. He is sentenced to prison and forced to sell his shop to a Muslim butcher while his troubled daughter is sent to an institution.

In prison, the Butcher has sex with a cellmate and (upon his release) he vows to forget it all happened. He finds a job working as a bartender for the woman who owns the tavern where he was a regular customer. They begin dating and soon she becomes pregnant. As they start making plans for their future together, she sells her business and they move to northern France, where she said she would buy a butcher shop for him.

There, however, she backs out of their promise, which forces him to take up a job as a nightwatchman at a nursing home. During his job, he meets a young and caring nurse who's the complete opposite of his old, icy mistress. After he and the nurse witness the death of an elderly patient, the Butcher thinks back about the lack of affection throughout his life, from the orphanage to a life with an uncaring mistress who abuses the power she has over him because of her money. When his mistress unjustly accuses him of having an affair with the nurse, he snaps and punches her in the belly several times, very likely killing their unborn child, before fleeing the scene with a pistol.

He decides to return to Paris, where he rents the same flophouse room where he conceived his daughter and begins looking for a job as a horse meat butcher. Unfortunately, due to the changing tastes of customers during his time in prison, the market for horse meat winds up collapsing. Despite his patience, his job interviews consistently end up with rejection. He broadens his job search but is considered unskilled in terms of general butchery, forcing him to have to start all over again at the very bottom.

He starts looking outside his branch, but the more he broadens his searches, the more humiliating the job interviews become. He remains polite, but the more desperate he becomes, the more quickly he's rejected by managers. When he turns to his old friends for advice, they all reject him. After being turned away at a slaughterhouse that once did business with his shop, the Butcher decides to kill the slaughterhouse manager. He plots the murder at a local tavern but is ejected from the bar at gunpoint after squabbling with the owner's son. The Butcher finds that he has only three bullets in his gun and begins assigning them to the men he feels have humiliated him the most.

Feeling more and more isolated, he decides to look for the only person he feels has ever loved him: His daughter. After meeting her at the asylum in which she is a patient, he takes her back to his room where he is prey to opposite feelings towards her. As he is about to lose his sanity, he contemplates molesting his daughter before killing her. After the representation of this fantasy, the movie returns to the moment of the Butcher's hesitation. He decides to put the gun away, resolving to be good, and tearfully embraces his daughter. But he starts again to contemplate having sex with her in the same manner he did with her mother.

Standing at a window, he unzips his daughter's jacket and begins fondling her. As he starts to abuse his daughter, the Butcher, between more and more incoherent thoughts, tries to justify his act by asserting that the world condemns his love for his daughter, surely not because it is evil but because it is too powerful.

Cast
 Philippe Nahon as the Butcher
 Blandine Lenoir as his daughter, Cynthia
 Frankye Pain as his Mistress
 Martine Audrain as his Mother-in-Law
 Roland Guéridon as his Old Friend
 Aïssa Djabri as Dr. Choukroun
 Gérard Ortega as the Bar Owner
 Alain Pierre as the Owner's Son
 Zaven as the Man with Morality

Production
The film was produced by Les Cinémas de la Zone, a production company run by director Noé and his girlfriend Lucile Hadžihalilović. It was shot in an unusual combination of 16 mm film and the CinemaScope format. Recording took place sporadically over a period of two and a half years, with frequent budget problems. The fashion designer agnès b. eventually granted a loan which Noé says saved his production company. The gimmick of having a warning text before the story's climax was borrowed from William Castle's 1961 film Homicidal.

According to a 2010 interview, Noé came up with the idea of the butcher character following a conversation he had with his father as a teenager. The Argentinian-born Noé was traveling to his mother's native France for the first time, and upon landing in Paris, his father turned to him and said: "They eat horses here" (referring to the French consumption of horse meat, which is unheard of in Argentina). Noé then decided that a horse meat butcher would make a great character in a film, and this formed the basis for his first short Carne.

Style
Most of the film's script consists of the Butcher's internal monologue, spoken in voice-over.

The camera is usually stationary throughout the film, but this trend is sometimes contrasted by abrupt, rapid movements. The sudden movements are always accompanied by a loud sound effect, usually an explosive gunshot. A notable exception is the final crane shot, which moves gently away from the Butcher's window and turns to look down an empty street.

The film frequently cuts to title cards that display a variety of messages. The cards often repeat a notable word spoken by the Butcher, such as "Morality" and "Justice". At the film's climax, a "Warning" title card counts down 30 seconds, gives viewers an opportunity to stop watching and avoid the remainder of the film.

Film connections
The film is a sequel to Noé's short film Carne. The Butcher also makes a cameo appearance at the beginning of Irréversible, Noe's follow-up to I Stand Alone. In a drunken monologue, the Butcher reveals that he was arrested for molesting his daughter.

Accolades
 International Critics' Week Award at the 1998 Cannes Film Festival
 Official Selection of Telluride, Toronto, New York, Rotterdam, San Francisco, Sundance film festivals.
 Selected as a favourite film by John Waters to present as his annual selection within Maryland Film Festival 2003.

References

External links
 
 
 
 Gaspar Noé, todo es cuestión de moral

1998 films
1998 crime drama films
1998 directorial debut films
1990s French films
1990s French-language films
1990s psychological drama films
Films directed by Gaspar Noé
Films set in the 1980s
French crime drama films
French psychological drama films
Heart of Sarajevo Award for Best Film winners
Incest in film